The Smith & Wesson Model 13 (Military & Police Magnum) is a .357 Magnum revolver designed for military and police use. It is based on Smith & Wesson's K-frame—specifically, it is a .357 Magnum version of the heavy-barrel variant of the .38 Special Model 10 (originally called the Military & Police).

Design
This is a double-action revolver with a capacity of six rounds. Barrel lengths are 3-inch and 4-inch with fixed sights. Both round-butt and square-butt versions were produced. The Model 19 is essentially the same gun with adjustable sights and a partial underlug. The Model 13 has a blued finish; the Model 65 is a variant in matte finish stainless steel.

The Model 13 was manufactured from 1974 to 1999. The Model 65 was manufactured from 1972 to 2004. The Model 13 should not be confused with the M13, which was a lightweight alloy revolver produced from 1954-56 for the U.S. Air Force, known as the Aircrewman. Engineering and production changes of the Model 13, indicated as a dash after the model number stamped on the frame:

13-1 (1974) introduced for the NYSP with model # stamping,

13-2 (1977) changed from gas ring on yoke to cylinder,

13-3 (1982) eliminated cylinder counterbore and pinned barrel/small change in cylinder length to 1.62",

13-4 (1988) new yoke retention system/radius stud package/floating hand/hammer nose busing

13-5 (1997) changes to frame design - cylinder stop stud eliminated/change to MIM hammer with floating firing pin/changes to internal clockwork.

Usage
Both models were issued by police agencies and federal law enforcement agencies in the United States.

The Model 13 was requested by the New York State Police in order to have a .357 Magnum revolver to replace their Model 10 .38 Special. The Model 65 in stainless steel came about at the request of the Oklahoma Highway Patrol.

The FBI issued the Model 13 with round butt and 3" heavy barrel shortly before switching to semi-automatic pistols.
According to Hickock45, the Model 13 was an FBI standard-issue between 1981 and 1991.
Apart from the USA, the ICAC of Hong Kong issued the revolver for replacement of the Smith & Wesson Model 10 revolver and the Colt Detective Special to the Arms Issued Officers, which they replaced in late 2005 with Glock and SIG Sauer semi-automatic pistols.

The Model 65 is used by the Texas Department of Criminal Justice.

References

External links
 

Smith & Wesson revolvers
Police weapons
Revolvers of the United States
.357 Magnum firearms